Det gör ont en stund på natten men inget på dan (It Hurts for a While at Night But Not at All by Day) is a studio album by Swedish pop singer Lena Philipsson, led by the first single and number one hit "Det gör ont" ("It Hurts"), which won Melodifestivalen 2004. The album was released on 4 August 2004, debuting at No. 1 in Sweden, and not falling until a few weeks thereafter. In 2005, more than 120,000 copies of the album had been sold, granting it a double-platinum certification.

Track listing
"Lena Anthem" – 4:16
"Det nya Europa" – 4:31
"Låt oss säga vi var gifta" – 4:34
"Det gör ont" – 3:06
"På gatan där jag bor" – 4:15
"Stopp! Nej! Gå härifrån!" – 3:27
"Delirium" – 4:29
"Ingenting är längre som förut" – 4:01
"Min mor sa till mig" – 4:24
"Säg det som det är" – 4:10
"Den dröm som alla drömmar drömmer" – 3:13

Charts

References

2004 albums
Columbia Records albums
Lena Philipsson albums